Clube União Micaelense  (known as CU Micaelense or U. Micaelense), is a Portuguese football club based in Ponta Delgada, Azores on the island of São Miguel in the Azores.

Background
CU Micaelense currently plays in the AF Ponta Delgada 1ª Divisão (known as the Campeonato de S. Miguel) which is the fifth tier of Portuguese football. The club was founded in 1911 and they currently play their home matches at the Campo Municipal Jâcome Correia in Ponta Delgada. The stadium is able to accommodate 1,500 spectators.

The club is affiliated to Associação de Futebol de Ponta Delgada and has competed in the AF Ponta Delgada Taça. The club has also entered the national cup competition known as Taça de Portugal on many occasions.

History
Clube União Micaelense was founded in late 1911 but it has links to the Sociedade Promotora da Agricultura Micaelense (English: Promotional Society of Micalense Agriculture) and Sociedade dos Amigos das Letras e Artes (English: Society of Friends of Arts and Letters) which was founded on 9 September 1848 by António Feliciano de Castilho.  The new Clube União Micaelense specialised in a number of sports including football and made use of a field at Mercado Agrícola in São Gonçalo.

The club won the Campeonato de Ponta Delgada (District Championship)  in 1928–29, 1945–46, 1946–47, 1947–48, 1955–56, 1958–59,  1959–69, 1960–61, 1961–62, 1962–63, 1963–64, 1964–65, 1965–66, 1966–67 and 1967–68 but first came to national prominence in 1961-62 when they proceeded to the quarter-finals of the Taça de Portugal before going out 2-1 and 8–1 over two legs to Vitoria Guimaraes. To get to this stage Micaelense won a qualifying tournament at the expense of Angústias Atlético of Horta, SC Lusitânia and finally CS Marítimo of Madeira.
The results of the qualifying tournament were:

18 March 1962: Clube União Micaelense 4 Angústias Atlético Clube 1
20 March 1962: Clube União Micaelense 2 Sport Clube Lusitânia 2
Açores – Madeira Elimination Final
6 April 1962: Clube União Micaelense 2  Clube Sport Marítimo 0
8 April 1962: Clube União Micaelense 1 Clube Sport Marítimo 2

The attendances at these matches and the trip to play Vitoria Guimaraes on the mainland represented a huge event at that time.  Micaelense were represented by João Maciel, Tibério A. M. Ribeiro, João M. R. Carroça, José T. Amorim, João M. Arruda, Rui S. Martins, Fernando C. Raposo, Miguel C. Dias, Manuel V. Félix, José da Silva, D. A. Santos Pereira, Manuel Luís da M. J. Costa, Octávio M. F. Pacheco and Eugénio R. Oliveira and the head coach was Henrique Ben David.

Micaelense have never been able to match their quarter-final appearance in the 1961-62 Taça de Portugal but in 2002-03 did reach the fifth round of the competition following victories against Casa Pia (4-2), Esposende (3-0), Sp.Pombal (3-3, 5-4 pens) before finally bowing out 4–1 away to Académica.

In terms of league success Micaelense first gained promotion to the Terceira Divisão at the end of the 1993–94 season. In their first season in Série E of the Terceira Divisão (Third Division) the club finished in 15th place and should have been relegated.  However, they were offered a reprieve with the formation of the Terceira Divisão Série Açores.  The club had a successful period in this new competition, which culminated in them winning the championship in the 1999–2000 season.

In 2000–01 Micaelense played in Segunda Divisão Série Sul (Second Division South) for the first time but were relegated at the end of the season. They returned a year later and played third tier football for the next 4 seasons, the most successful being in 2003–04 when the club finished in third position. Relegation arose at the end of the 2005–06 followed by six seasons back in the  Terceira Divisão Série Açores, during which there has been a gradual decline in the club's fortunes.  The descent culminated in a further relegation at the end of the 2011–12 season and they are now back in the Campeonato de Ponta Delgada (District Championship) where they previously played up until 1993–94.

The most famous player to have appeared for the club is Pauleta, former star of Paris Saint-Germain. However, he left the islands at the age of 16, and only learned his basic skills at U. Micaelense.

The club's derby rival for a number of years were CD Operário from the neighbouring town of Lagoa. Also the team from FC Madalena, the capital Pico Island, has been considered a part of local rivalry.

The club previously played at Campo da Grotinha.

Season to season

Honours
Terceira Divisão: 1999–00

Notable former players 
 Hugo Nunes Coelho
 Pauleta
 Nuno Sociedade
 Tininho

Notable former managers 
 Quim

Footnotes

External links
Official website 

 
Football clubs in Portugal
Football clubs in the Azores
Association football clubs established in 1911
CU Micaelense
CU Micaelense
Football clubs in São Miguel Island